Jamba is a town in  Angola, located in the southeastern province of Cuando Cubango, just north of the Namibian border along the Caprivi Strip.

The town is best known as the former military headquarters of UNITA, a rebel movement supported by South Africa and the United States that fought the Soviet-aligned and supported government in the Angolan Civil War, a Cold War conflict.

Etymology 
The name Jamba means elephant in Umbundu, a language spoken in Southern Angola.

UNITA headquarters
Jamba served as UNITA's headquarters from 1976 until 1992. The headquarters itself was an elaborate military encampment, with radar capabilities and sophisticated anti-aircraft weaponry that protected the headquarters throughout 16 years of war. UNITA also maintained a large military airstrip in Jamba.

Author Paul Hare described Jamba as "a spread out, well-organised guerrilla encampment, carefully planned and camouflaged to protect against air attacks".

On December 24, 1999, Jamba was captured by the military of Angola.

Jonas Savimbi
UNITA was led by Jonas Savimbi, a charismatic political and military leader who is generally considered one of the more important figures in the history of Angola.  Savimbi forged relations with the U.S. and ultimately became an important proxy for the West during the Cold War.

Savimbi's critics allege that his military campaign was hugely costly and destructive to modern Angola and that, during the Civil War, human rights were violated by Savimbi and UNITA.  Similar allegations, however, also were made against the government of Angola during the war.

Jamba under UNITA
Under the U.S. administrations of Ronald Reagan and George H. W. Bush, Jamba grew as a major center of UNITA rebel activity, with the construction of elaborate air defense capabilities and runways designed for the replenishment of U.S. war supplies, which were shipped to UNITA.  Both Zaire and South Africa cooperated with the U.S. in supporting Savimbi and UNITA in their war against the Marxist Angolan government.

In 1985, Jamba was the host of the Democratic International or "Jamba Jamboree", a meeting of global anti-communist insurgents organized by United States conservatives, including Jack Abramoff. At the conference, the participants signed a communiqué declaring "our solidarity with all freedom movements in the world and ... our commitment to cooperate to liberate our nations from the Soviet imperialists" Other participants in the conference included:

Adolfo Calero, Contra leader.
Pa Kao Her, Laotian resistance leader.
Lewis Lehrman, American businessman and politician.
Abdurrahim Wardak, Afghan mujahideen leader.
Jack Wheeler, American conservative.

In later years, Savimbi was visited regularly in Jamba by some of his closest American advisors and advocates, including Michael Johns, Grover Norquist, and others.

Reagan doctrine

The policy of support for anti-communist resistance movements, which was supported by The Heritage Foundation and other influential conservatives, ultimately came to be known as the Reagan Doctrine and was a central component of the foreign policies of the Reagan and (to a lesser extent) George H. W. Bush administrations.

In popular culture
In Call of Duty: Black Ops II, Jamba was the staging point where Jonas Savimbi starts his counterattack on MPLA forces while being aided by CIA agents Hudson and Mason while the agents are searching for a squad gone MIA (Missing In Action).

See also
Jamba, Huíla

References

External links
"Savimbi's Elusive Victory in Angola" , by Michael Johns, Congressional Record, October 26, 1989 (Heritage Foundation policy analyst Michael Johns article on one of his visits to Jamba).
"My Dinner with Jack," by Mark Hemingway, The Weekly Standard, April 3, 2006 (provides some history on the "Democratic International" meeting in Jamba, including the involvement of lobbyist Jack Abramoff).

Populated places in Cuando Cubango Province
History of Angola
UNITA
Cities in Africa